The Minneapolis Millers were a minor league baseball team from 1884 to 1960.

Minneapolis Millers could also be:

 Minneapolis Millers (AHA) a minor league ice hockey team from 1925 to 1950
 Minneapolis Millers (IHL) a minor league ice hockey team from 1959 to 1963

See also
Minneapolis Millerettes women baseball team 1944.